Avigilon is a Canadian subsidiary of Motorola Solutions, which specializes in the design and development of video analytics, network video management software, surveillance cameras, and access control products.

Avigilon devices are assembled in North America in facilities located in Richmond, British Columbia, Canada, and Richardson, Texas, United States.

History
Avigilon Corporation was founded in 2004 by Alexander Fernandes in Vancouver, British Columbia, Canada.

Avigilon announced the first high-definition surveillance system in 2006 and began selling products in 2007. Avigilon has expanded its offerings to include a broad range of high-definition cameras and devices suited for various environments.

The company is known for its advanced video analytics, including Avigilon Appearance Search™ and Unusual Motion Detection (UMD) technologies. In 2018 Avigilon released Avigilon Blue™, a cloud based video monitoring software.

Avigilon went public on November 8, 2011 on the Toronto Stock Exchange (TSX).

In February 2018  Motorola Solutions agreed to acquire Avigilon in a deal worth C$1.2 billion. The acquisition was completed in March 2018.

In February 2021 Motorola Solutions announced the opening of a new U.S. factory in Richardson, Texas where video surveillance products for several of its brands, including Avigilon, will be manufactured. Due to the opening of the Richardson facility, an Avigilon-specific facility in Plano, Texas was closed.

Technology 

 Network Security Cameras - Avigilon develops and sells network cameras for many applications. Cameras typically support advance video analytics that can detect behavior and recognize entities.
 Physical Access Control 
 Video Encoders  - Avigilon develops and sells video encoders to allow traditional analogue CCTV cameras to become IP based devices.
 Video Monitoring Software - Avigilon develops and sells video monitoring software which allows communications with Avigilon and third party devices such as IP Cameras and Access Control Units.

See also
 IP video surveillance
 Image sensor
 Professional video over IP
 Closed-circuit television (CCTV)
 Closed-circuit television camera
 Video Analytics
 ONVIF
 Physical security

References

Manufacturing companies based in Vancouver
Electronics companies of Canada
Video surveillance companies